Kaka, also known as Kaakhka, Kaakcha or Chaacha, is a city in and capital of Kaka District, Ahal Province, Turkmenistan.  It lies on the Trans-Caspian railway and the M37 highway.

Etymology
The name Kaka is of obscure origin. Some local elders have attributed it to an eponymous "long-forgotten" local king, while others to the Persian onomatopoeic word  قهقهه (Qahqahe) "ha-ha", a deep laugh, indicating that the area is a happy land. The current spelling of the name, Kaka, was established by parliamentary decree in April 1992.

History 
Timur had a fortress—of unknown antiquity—restored in 1382 during his campaigns in East Caspian lands, and named it "Kahkah". The ruins of the fortress command immense archaeological significance.

Overview
Fighting took place in Kaka between the Trans Caspian Mensheviks and the Tashkent Bolsheviks on 28 August and on 11 and 18 September 1918 during the Russian Civil War. Troops of the British India Army were involved.

Transport 
There is a Tsarist era railway station.

References

Populated places in Ahal Region